Vice Admiral Alfred Eugene Montgomery (12 June 1891 – 15 December 1961) was an officer in the United States Navy who served in World War I and World War II. A graduate of the Naval Academy, he participated in operations in the Mexican waters during the Mexican Revolution. He trained for submarines, and became executive officer of the submarine . In November 1914 he reported to the Mare Island Naval Shipyard where the new submarine  was being fitted out, and served as her commander from June 1917 until she was lost on 17 December 1917.

In June 1922, Montgomery qualified as a naval aviator. He commanded observation and torpedo squadrons, and was executive officer of the aircraft carrier  from November 1936 until June 1938, and her commanding officer from June 1940 to June 1941. In June 1941, he became chief of staff and aide to Commander Aircraft, Atlantic Fleet. As such, he commanded a Task Group of the Fast Carrier Task Force in the Gilbert and Marshall Islands campaign, Battle of the Philippine Sea, and the Philippines campaign. After the war, he commanded the Fifth Fleet and the First Task Fleet.

Early life
Alfred Eugene Montgomery was born in Omaha, Nebraska, on 12 June 1891, the son of Eugene and Julia Smith Montgomery. He was educated in Omaha and at Brookline High School in Massachusetts. He was appointed to the United States Naval Academy at Annapolis, Maryland, from Nebraska in 1908. He graduated with the Class of 1912 on 8 June 1912, and was commissioned as an ensign in 1914.

His first assignment was to the battleship . Between February 1914 and July 1915 he served on the cruiser , participating in operations in the Mexican waters during the Mexican Revolution, the cruiser  and the battleship .

In July 1915, he joined the submarine service. After a training course on the old monitor USS Tonopah, he became executive officer of the submarine . In November 1914 he reported to the Mare Island Naval Shipyard where the new submarine  was being fitted out. He served as its commander from June 1917 until 17 December 1917, when F-1 collided with her sister ship  during maneuvers, and sank within seconds with the loss of nineteen of her crew.

Montgomery was then assigned to the submarine , which was being fitted out at the Union Iron Works in San Francisco. He became its commander when it was commissioned on 26 October 1918.

In January 1922, Montgomery reported to the Naval Air Station, Pensacola, Florida, where he qualified as a naval aviator on 8 June 1922. He then became executive officer of VO-2, the observation squadron operating from the aircraft tender . In 1923 he became commander of VO-1 and then VO-6. After a short period as aide to Captain Walter R. Gherardi, who commanded the Scouting Fleet's aircraft squadrons from the aircraft tender , he became commander of the torpedo bomber squadron VT-1. He was posted to the Naval Air Station San Diego as assembly and repair officer in 1925, becoming its executive officer the next year. He then returned to sea as head of the air department on the aircraft carrier .

Following the usual pattern of alternating sea and shore duty, he commanded the Naval Air Station Seattle from August 1930 to May 1932. From July 1932 until May 1933 he was an aviation officer on the Staff of Commander Cruisers, Scouting Force, on its flagship, . He then became the head of the Aviation Section, Ship's Movement Division in the Office of the Chief of Naval Operations at the Navy Department in Washington, D.C., and commanded the Naval Air Station Anacostia from July 1934 to February 1936.

He returned to sea in February 1936 as plans and operations officer on the staff of Commander Aircraft, Battle Force, Rear Admiral Henry V. Butler, and later Rear Admiral Frederick J. Horne.  He was executive officer of the aircraft carrier  in November 1936 until June 1938, and of Naval Air Station San Diego again from July 1938 to July 1939.

World War II
Montgomery served as head of the Flight Division in the Bureau of Aeronautics in the Navy Department from July 1939 until June 1940, when he assumed command of Ranger. In June 1941 he became Chief of Staff and Aide to the Commander Aircraft, Atlantic Fleet, subsequently redesignated Commander Carriers, Atlantic Fleet, Rear Admiral Arthur B. Cook. He was serving in this post when the United States entered World War II after the bombing of Pearl Harbor in December 1941. In this role, he was preoccupied with hunting and sinking German U-boats in the Atlantic.

Promoted to rear admiral in May 1942, Montgomery became commander of the Naval Air Station Corpus Christi in June, and then the Naval Air Training Center there in November.  For his service at Corpus Christi, he was awarded the Legion of Merit. His citation read: 

AS such he led the raid on Wake Island on 5-6 October 1943, his force being designated Task Force 14. As such, he commanded a Task Group of the Fast Carrier Task Force, which was known as Task Force 58 when part of the Fifth Fleet and Task Force 38 when part of the Third Fleet. His Task Group attacked Rabaul on 11 November, and then bombed Tarawa for three days from 18 to 20 November. For his part in the campaign, he was awarded the Navy Distinguished Service Medal:

For a raid on Saipan, Montgomery was award the Navy Cross: 

While his forces won a great victory in the Battle of the Philippine Sea, Montgomery, in his report on the battle, expressed his opinion that: 

Montgomery was awarded a second Navy Distinguished Service Medal for his part:

A third Navy Distinguished Service Medal was awarded for the Philippines campaign:

Montgomery became Commander Fleet Air, West Coast, with his headquarters at the Naval Air Station, San Diego, in January 1945. He tried to bring his experiences in combat to bear in his new role, which involved supplying the combat units with men and equipment. For his services in this job, he was awarded a second Legion of Merit. In July 1945 he became commander of Pacific Fleet Air Forces, with the rank of vice admiral.

Later life
After the war, Montgomery became commander of the Fifth Fleet in August 1946, flying his flag from the command ship . The position of commander of the Fifth Fleet then became commander of First Task Fleet, on 1 January 1947. He then became commander of the First Task Fleet in July 1947, flying his flag from the battleship . He reverted to his permanent rank of rear admiral in August 1947, and became commander of the Alaskan Sea Frontier and the 17th Naval District. He commanded the U.S. Naval Base Bermuda from 1949 to 1950. His last command, in February 1950, was Commander Fleet Air, at Jacksonville, Florida. He retired in July 1951, upon which he was given a tombstone promotion to vice admiral.

Montgomery died at the Naval Hospital in Bremerton, Washington, on 13 December 1961, at the age of 70. He was survived by his wife, Alice Claire Smith Montgomery, and his daughter Anne. His son, Lieutenant Brooke Montgomery, was killed in a plane crash on 1 February 1956.

Notes

References

 
 
 

1891 births
1961 deaths
Military personnel from Omaha, Nebraska
Recipients of the Navy Distinguished Service Medal
Recipients of the Legion of Merit
Recipients of the Navy Cross (United States)
United States Naval Academy alumni
United States Navy admirals
United States Navy World War II admirals
Brookline High School alumni